The New England Tea Men were an American professional soccer team based in Greater Boston. They played in the North American Soccer League (NASL) from 1978 to 1980. Their home venues for outdoor play were Schaefer Stadium (shared with the NFL's New England Patriots) in Foxborough, Massachusetts, and Nickerson Field near Boston University. They also played one season of indoor soccer in the NASL, using the Providence Civic Center for home games.

The Tea Men were originally owned by Unilever's Lipton subsidiary and given their unusual name as a nod to both the company's product line and the Boston Tea Party.

The Tea Men won their division in 1978 and made a further playoff run in 1980. However, the team struggled for financial solvency in Massachusetts. Right at the start of the 1980–81 indoor season they relocated to Jacksonville, Florida and became the Jacksonville Tea Men.

History
Led in its initial season by former Charlton Athletic F.C. striker Mike Flanagan, the Tea Men won their division to much public acclaim, with Flanagan winning the league MVP award.  

Subsequent seasons proved not as successful for two important reasons. First, Flanagan, contracted to Charlton, remained in England (an attempt to secure him via a transfer failed, reportedly over endorsement rights). Second, the team was temporarily evicted from Schaefer Stadium in Foxborough, Massachusetts when the owners of Foxboro Raceway – located next door – claimed that the Tea Men's matches were causing traffic problems on racing dates. 

After spending one unhappy season at Nickerson Field on the campus of Boston University, the team reached an accord with Foxboro Raceway to play in Foxboro, but not on racing dates. As a result, the Tea Men had to play many Monday night matches, which caused attendance to dwindle. At one home game during the 1980 season, only 254 fan attended a game, an all time low for the NASL.

After leaving New England, the team moved to Jacksonville, Florida and became the Jacksonville Tea Men.

Year-by-year

Honors

Division Champions (1)
 1983 Southern Division

NASL Most Valuable Player
 1978 Mike Flanagan

U.S. Soccer Hall of Fame
 2003 Arnie Mausser

All-Star first team selections
 1978 Gerry Daly, Mike Flanagan, Kevin Keelan, Chris Turner

All-Star honorable mentions
 1978 Dave D'Errico
 1979 Artur Correia & Gerry Daly

Staff
 Derek Carroll – President
  Bill Alex – Play-by-Play Announcer
 Steve Glendye – Color Commentator on Northeast Sports Network

Coaches
 Noel Cantwell – Head Coach
 Dennis Viollet – Assistant Manager

See also
Boston Rovers
Boston Beacons
Boston Minutemen
Jacksonville Tea Men
New England Revolution

References 

Defunct soccer clubs in Massachusetts
North American Soccer League (1968–1984) teams
Defunct indoor soccer clubs in the United States
1978 establishments in Massachusetts
1980 disestablishments in Massachusetts
Sports competitions in Foxborough, Massachusetts
Soccer clubs in Massachusetts
Association football clubs disestablished in 1980
Association football clubs established in 1978
Defunct soccer clubs in Rhode Island
Sports in Providence, Rhode Island

it:Jacksonville Tea Men